Bedrock is a DJ mix album produced by John Digweed.  It was released in the United Kingdom on INCredible and in the United States on Ultra Records. The album was based on the music Digweed would play at the long running and successful club night, Bedrock. At the time of the album's release the club night was held at Heaven, London and The Beach, Brighton.

Track listing

Disc one
Raff 'N' Freddy - Listen  – 7:41
Tiny Trendies - The Sky Is Not Crying (Beutel Bill's Peak-Hour News Mix)  – 5:40
B.P.T. featuring Danny Morales - Moody (Montreal Men Vocal Dub Remix)  – 7:04
C12 featuring Jole - Judy (Montreal Men Remix)  – 6:02
Los Diablos Locos - El Locomotion  – 4:01
Science Department - Repercussion  – 8:20
Morel - True (The Faggot Is You) (Deep Dish Poof Daddy Dub)  – 3:44
Morel - True (The Faggot Is You) (Deep Dish Poof Daddy Remix)  – 7:39
Jondi & Spesh - We Are Connected (Active Love Mix) – 6:27
ABA Structure - Illusion  – 5:32
Funk Function - Odysseus  – 5:02
Science Department - Persuasion  – 6:24

Disc two
Pob & Taylor - Ba Ba (Human Movement Remix)  – 9:19
Escape - Salina  – 5:57
Dakota - Swirl  – 6:26
Heller & Farley - The Rising Sun (Bedrock Remix)  – 9:25
Interstate - CC16  – 4:10
Voyager - Time Travel  – 5:57
Sandra Collins - Flutterby  – 8:20
Mark Hunt - Over & Out  – 4:31
Slacker - Flying  – 6:26
Bedrock - Heaven Scent  – 7:17

References

External links
Discogs entry

John Digweed albums
1999 remix albums